Luis Enrique Martínez García (born 8 May 1970), known as Luis Enrique, is a Spanish football manager and former player.

A versatile player with good technique, he was capable of playing in several different positions, but usually played as a midfielder or forward, and was also noted for his temperament and stamina. Starting in 1991 and ending in 2004, he represented both Real Madrid and Barcelona with both individual and team success, appearing in more than 500 official games and scoring more than 100 goals. He appeared with the Spain national football team in three World Cups and one European Championship.

Luis Enrique started working as a manager in 2008 with Barcelona B, before moving to Roma three years later. In the 2013–14 season he managed Celta, before returning to Barcelona and winning the treble in his first year and the double in his second; in 2018, he was appointed Spain head coach for the first time before resigning for family reasons in 2019. He reassumed the position the same year and subsequently led the team to the semi-finals of Euro 2020 and the second place in the 2020–21 Nations League, resigning at the end of the 2022 World Cup.

Playing career

Club
Luis Enrique was born in Gijón, Asturias, and began his career with local Sporting de Gijón, where he gained the nickname Lucho after Luis Flores, a Mexican forward in the team. He then spent most of his playing days with the two biggest Spanish clubs: first Real Madrid for five seasons and, in 1996, after seeing out his contract and notably scoring in a 5–0 home win against FC Barcelona in January 1995, stating later he "rarely felt appreciated by the Real Madrid supporters and didn't have good memories there", he moved to their fierce rivals at the Camp Nou on a free transfer. The Catalans' supporters were at first hesitant about their new acquisition, but he soon won the hearts of the cules, staying eight years, eventually becoming team captain and scoring several times in El Clásico against his former employers; he passionately celebrated at the Santiago Bernabéu, where he grabbed his jersey after a 25-yard strike that beat the opposing goalkeeper.

Luis Enrique netted 46 La Liga goals in his first three seasons with Barcelona, with the side finishing runner-up in 1996–97 and subsequently winning back-to-back domestic championship accolades. Furthermore, he was named Spanish Player of the Year by El País in the following campaign. He also scored the opening goal in the 1997 UEFA Super Cup, a 3–1 aggregate triumph against Borussia Dortmund.

During his final years in Barcelona, Luis Enrique was often injured, and did not want to renew his contract. He had been offered a deal by his first club Sporting, which he, however, declined, stating that "he wouldn't be able to reach the level he demanded of himself" and that "he wouldn't be doing Sporting much of a favour by going there." His concerns about his level and fitness made him retire on 10 August 2004 at the age of 34, and he finished his professional career with league totals of 400 games and 102 goals, being named by Pelé as one of the top 125 greatest living footballers in March.

International
Luis Enrique played for Spain in three FIFA World Cups: 1994, 1998 and 2002 (as well as UEFA Euro 1996), and scored 12 goals while gaining 62 caps. He was also a member of the gold-winning squad at the 1992 Summer Olympics in Barcelona, and made his debut for the main side on 17 April 1991, featuring for 22 minutes in a 0–2 friendly loss to Romania in Cáceres.

In the 1994 World Cup, held in the United States, Luis Enrique scored his first international goal, in the round-of-16 3–0 win over Switzerland in Washington, D.C. In the 1–2 quarter-final defeat against Italy at Foxboro Stadium, Mauro Tassotti's elbow made contact with his face to bloody effect, but during the match the incident went unpunished – Tassotti was banned for eight games afterwards; when Spain met Italy at Euro 2008 on 22 June, to battle for a place in the semi-finals, Luis Enrique reportedly called for the team to "take revenge" for the 1994 World Cup incident by beating Italy. Tassotti, an assistant coach with A.C. Milan at the time, told the newspaper Marca that he was tired of always being reminded of this incident, and that he had never intended to hurt the Spaniard.

At the 1998 World Cup, Luis Enrique played a major role in a 6–1 rout of Bulgaria in the last game of the group, scoring and assisting once and also winning a penalty, but the Spaniards were eliminated nonetheless. On 5 June of the following year he netted a hat-trick, in a 9–0 win in Villarreal over San Marino in the Euro 2000 qualifiers.

On 23 June 2002, Luis Enrique retired from international football, in order to give the younger players more playing time and focus only on his club.

Player profile

Having occupied several positions, Luis Enrique was most noted for his exceptional versatility and consistency. He was capable of playing anywhere in midfield or along the front line, and was fielded in all positions on the pitch throughout his career, except those of central defender and goalkeeper. A strong, courageous, energetic and hard-working team player, with good technical skills, flair and notable stamina, his usual position was as an attacking midfielder in the centre of the pitch, due to his ability to link-up the forwards and the midfield, or as a right winger, but he was capable of playing anywhere along the right flank, and was often deployed as an attacking full back or wing-back, or even as a left winger on occasion.

Due to his keen eye for goal and ability to make attacking runs into the box, Luis Enrique frequently played as a forward, either in a withdrawn role as a second striker behind the team's main goalscorer, or even as an out-and-out striker or centre forward – he was also used in deeper midfield roles. In addition to his playing abilities, he also stood out for his commitment, temperament, determination and leadership.

Coaching career

Barcelona B
On 26 May 2008, Luis Enrique returned to Barcelona, taking over the reins of the B team, renamed Barcelona Atlètic for that season. As he succeeded long-time Barcelona teammate Pep Guardiola, he stated: "I have come home", and "I finished playing here and now I will start coaching here."; in his second season he found success, helping the club return to Segunda División after an absence of 11 years.

In mid-March 2011, Luis Enrique announced he would leave at the end of the campaign, despite still having two years left on his contract. He led the side to the playoffs, but they were ineligible for promotion.

Roma
On 8 June 2011, Luis Enrique reached an agreement with Italian Serie A club A.S. Roma to become the Giallorossis new head coach. He signed a two-year contract, being joined by a staff of four members, including Iván de la Peña who played two years for crosstown rivals S.S. Lazio, as technical collaborator.

Roma was eliminated from the UEFA Europa League by ŠK Slovan Bratislava, amid great discussion of the substitution of legendary Francesco Totti for Stefano Okaka. The capital-based side also lost their first game in the domestic league against Cagliari Calcio, making it just the third time that they lost the opener in 18 years.

Even though he still had two years remaining on his contract, Luis Enrique decided to leave Roma at the end of the season after failure to qualify for any European competition.

Celta
On 8 June 2013, Luis Enrique became RC Celta de Vigo's new manager, replacing former national teammate Abel Resino. He led the Galicians to the ninth position in his first and only season, highlights including a 2–0 home win against Real Madrid that ended the opposition's possibilities of winning the league title.

On 16 May 2014, Luis Enrique announced that he would be leaving Celta.

Barcelona
On 19 May 2014, Luis Enrique returned to Barcelona as a manager on a two-year deal. He was recommended by sporting director Andoni Zubizarreta, his former national teammate. His first competitive match was a 3–0 home league win over Elche CF, where he handed debuts to new signings Claudio Bravo, Jérémy Mathieu and Ivan Rakitić, and gave youth products Munir El Haddadi, Rafinha and Sandro their maiden league appearances for the club, while summer signing Luis Suárez was unavailable for selection due to suspension.

Luis Enrique suffered his first defeat in the competition on 25 October 2014, away against Real Madrid, and although Barcelona had a successful run in the year, his management came under scrutiny because of his tactics involving several lineup changes in consecutive games. Moreover, a quarrel with Lionel Messi and other players further accentuated the team's poor form.

Amid reports of dressing room unrest, in early January, and on back of a defeat to Real Sociedad Zubizarreta was sacked, weakening Luis Enrique's standing at the club. A significant upturn in form followed, as a result of the coach deciding on a settled lineup with a tweak in the formation: Messi and Neymar now played as inverted wingers, while Suárez was the lone striker. The team won at home to champions Atlético Madrid who had previously defeated them 6 times in a row in all competitions. He soon equaled Guardiola's record of 11 consecutive victories, while the side went on to beat Atlético Madrid and Villarreal CF convincingly in the Copa del Rey to advance to the final. In the domestic league, after eight wins in nine matches, they returned to the top of the table after 15 weeks.

On 21 April 2015, Luis Enrique recorded his 42nd win after 50 games in charge of Barcelona with a 2–0 victory over Paris Saint-Germain FC, the best record of any manager. He went on to lead the club to the final of the UEFA Champions League and, on 17 May, led it to its 23rd national championship with one match to spare following a 1–0 win at the Vicente Calderón Stadium against Atlético Madrid. On 6 June, having earlier won the domestic cup against Athletic Bilbao by the same score, the team sealed a treble with a 3–1 defeat of Juventus F.C. in the Champions League Final in Berlin, and three days later he signed a new contract until 2017.

On 11 August 2015, Barcelona won the 2015 UEFA Super Cup 5–4 against Sevilla FC. On 2 December, against CF Villanovense in the Copa del Rey round of 32, Luis Enrique decided against bringing on a new player following Mathieu's injury with 12 minutes to go even though two replacements could still be made, as the score was 6–1 at that time and the manager said he did not want to risk introducing players to the game without adequate warm-up.

In his first two seasons, Luis Enrique rotated his goalkeepers, with Bravo playing league games and Marc-André ter Stegen playing cup and European matches. Both players, however, expressed opposition to this policy. A second double was achieved on 22 May 2016, following a 2–0 Copa del Rey victory over Sevilla FC after extra time in which the team played more than 50 minutes with one player less, following the dismissal of Javier Mascherano.

On 1 March 2017, Luis Enrique announced that he would not continue as team manager after 30 June on expiration of his contract.

Spain
Luis Enrique was named coach of the Spain national team on 9 July 2018, replacing former club and country teammate Fernando Hierro. His first match in charge occurred on 8 September, and he led the side to a 2–1 win against England in the UEFA Nations League at Wembley Stadium.

In November 2019, Luis Enrique rejoined the national team after having quit his post for personal reasons four months prior. Speaking to the press after his return, a visibly angry Luis Enrique alleged his friend and colleague of six years Robert Moreno — who managed the national team after his resignation — was "disloyal" and wanted to hold on to his interim position.

When Luis Enrique selected a 24-man Euro 2020 squad — despite being allowed 26 — that contained no Real Madrid players, he was accused of having an anti-Madrid bias. Several high-profile omissions from his squad were seen as a way for him to assert control over the dressing room and the team. However, he led Spain to the tournament's semi-finals, in which they lost against Italy on penalties, after a 1–1 draw.

At the 2022 World Cup, Luis Enrique's team was ousted in the round of 16 following another shootout, 3–0 against Morocco. In the wake of this performance, he stepped down from his position.

Manager profile
Tactics
One of the most renowned and successful managers of his generation, Luis Enrique's incisive and direct football featuring quick transitions from defense to attack, though reliant on the front three of Messi, Suárez and Neymar, was in sharp contrast to the possession-heavy approach of Barcelona managers immediately prior to him. Statistically, Luis Enrique's Barcelona, in his first two years at the club, were better than Guardiola's: Comparatively his team had scored more goals and conceded fewer, had a higher win percentage and won competitions at a similar rate. Guardiola hailed them as the best counter-attacking team in the world.

In his first two seasons at the Camp Nou, Luis Enrique fielded a 4–3–3 formation. Results improved after he stopped tinkering with his starting eleven. The team's creative outlet was the wings with Neymar and Messi as inside forwards flanking Suárez, a departure from their usual playing style. Ivan Rakitić played a pivotal role in transitioning defense to attack, and Andrés Iniesta's influence withered, while Xavi, the club's captain, reduced to a part-time, substitute role. With overlapping full-backs offering width, Neymar and Messi often drifted in-field, encouraging midfielders, Rakitic and Iniesta, to move into channels and attack in and around the box. In his third and final year, struggling for form and results, the manager switched to a 3–4–3 offense morphing into a 4–4–2 defensive shape, reminiscent of Antonio Conte's Premier League winners Chelsea more than Johan Cryuff's Dream Team, with Messi at the top of a midfield diamond, acting as chief play-maker, and Sergio Busquets, the sole holding defensive midfielder, responsible for breaking the first-line of opposition press. The system favoured Neymar in particular, who played as a left forward, often cutting inside to link with lone striker Suárez, or to create an overload in the final-third sharing creative responsibilities with Messi. This change in formation was instrumental as they overcame 0–4, the biggest first-leg deficit in Champions League history, by defeating PSG 6–1 in the second-leg; however, the physical and tactical discipline required to sustain a 3–4–3 proved controversial.

Luis Enrique continued to favour 4–3–3 for Spain, and at times the riskier 3–4–3 when the situation demands, with the sole defensive midfielder in the pivot being the only commonality. Lacking the front three he had at Barcelona, his football retains positional and vertical aspects, though with box-to-box central midfielders, like Koke or Pedri, offering attacking thrust while the center forward drops deep to bring wide forwards into play, accompanied by overlapping full-backs who offer width. Whilst pressing oppositions high-up, the center forward, usually Álvaro Morata, screens the opposition defensive midfielder as wide forwards engage opposition center backs. Spain's defensive midfielder, often Busquets, tracks the run of opposition attackers when they drop deep, some times pressing higher than the team's other central midfielders. In possession, Spain usually start playing out from the back, to draw the opposition in, with Thiago Alcântara or any other central midfielder, dropping alongside Busquets to help progress the ball forward. Should the opposition press aggressively, the full-backs link up to offer additional passing options as the center backs go deep and narrow. Wide forwards make diagonal runs into the midfield to link play with those in front of them. Once the ball has been progressed out of the defense, they adjust their attacking rhythm to match opposition's defensive structure, either opting for a speedy transition against a higher block or relying on a more positional approach play against a lower block. To mix it up, Spain initially build up short in the defensive-third to then play long to the center forward who then attempts to bring outfield runners in to play. Wing play is used to stretch opposition and create spaces infield or create crossing opportunities, especially against compact defenses.

Known for his brave and fearless management style, Luis Enrique is quick to curb out source of any influence that undermines his authority. Reports of his altercation with Messi at Barcelona and with Totti at Roma, both of whom wield considerable power at their respective clubs, being prime examples of that. His flexibility in adopting different playing styles, while at odds with the possession-based style synonymous with Barcelona, furthered this narrative, as he continued to remain unfazed in the face of criticism and pressure. Royal Spanish Football Federation president Luis Rubiales, on the back of three consecutive unsuccessful tournaments, appointed him to curb ill-discipline and complacency in the squad, stating: "We are looking for an incontestable leader, who sets out the path, and nobody then strays from that path."

Reception
Messi described Luis Enrique as one of the two best managers he has played for, the other being Guardiola. While Guardiola maintains that though he has played against many great footballing sides as a manager, Luis Enrique's Barcelona and Jürgen Klopp's Liverpool were the best he has ever faced.

In comparing the managers he has played for, Spain international Alcântara said, "[Luis Enrique] has the analytical positioning of Pep [and] the aggressiveness of Klopp" while also praising Luis Enrique's communication skills in conveying his footballing ideas.

Endorsements
Luis Enrique was sponsored by sportswear company Nike, and appeared in commercials for the brand. In a global advertising campaign in the run-up to the 2002 World Cup in South Korea and Japan, he starred in a "Secret Tournament" commercial (branded "Scorpion KO") directed by Terry Gilliam, appearing alongside footballers such as Luís Figo, Thierry Henry, Hidetoshi Nakata, Roberto Carlos, Ronaldinho, Ronaldo and Totti, with former player Eric Cantona the tournament "referee".

Personal life
After retiring from football, Luis Enrique lived for a while in Australia to practise surfing. He took part in the 2005 edition of the New York City Marathon, finished the Amsterdam Marathon in 2006, the Firenze Marathon in 2007 and the Marathon des Sables in 2008, while also entering and finishing Frankfurt Ironman in 2007. He was due to take part in the Klagenfurt Ironman competition in July 2008, but eventually declined due to his engagement as manager of Barcelona B.

Luis Enrique married his longtime partner Elena Cullell on 27 December 1997. Their daughter, Xana, died of bone cancer at age 9 on 29 August 2019.

Career statistics
Club

Notes

International

Scores and results list Spain's goal tally first, score column indicates score after each Luis Enrique goal.

Managerial statistics

Honours
PlayerReal Madrid La Liga: 1994–95
 Copa del Rey: 1992–93
 Supercopa de España: 1993Barcelona La Liga: 1997–98, 1998–99
 Copa del Rey: 1996–97, 1997–98
 Supercopa de España: 1996
 UEFA Cup Winners' Cup: 1996–97
 UEFA Super Cup: 1997Spain U23 Summer Olympic Games: 1992Individual La Liga Breakthrough Player: 1990–91
 ESM Team of the Year: 1996–97
 FIFA 100

ManagerBarcelona La Liga: 2014–15, 2015–16
 Copa del Rey: 2014–15, 2015–16, 2016–17
 Supercopa de España: 2016
 UEFA Champions League: 2014–15
 UEFA Super Cup: 2015
 FIFA Club World Cup: 2015Spain UEFA Nations League runner-up: 2020–21Individual'
 La Liga Coach of the Year: 2015
 FIFA World Coach of the Year: 2015
 IFFHS World's Best Club Coach: 2015
 World Soccer Manager of the Year: 2015
 European Coach of the Year – Alf Ramsey Award: 2015
 European Coach of the Season: 2014–15
 La Liga Manager of the Month: May 2016

See also
 List of FC Barcelona players (100+ appearances)
 List of La Liga players (400+ appearances)
 List of Real Madrid CF players

References

External links

 FC Barcelona official profile
 
 
 
 

1970 births
Living people
Spanish footballers
Footballers from Gijón
Association football midfielders
Association football forwards
Association football utility players
La Liga players
Segunda División B players
Tercera División players
Sporting de Gijón B players
Sporting de Gijón players
Real Madrid CF players
FC Barcelona players
Spain under-21 international footballers
Spain under-23 international footballers
Spain international footballers
1994 FIFA World Cup players
UEFA Euro 1996 players
1998 FIFA World Cup players
2002 FIFA World Cup players
Footballers at the 1992 Summer Olympics
Olympic footballers of Spain
Olympic gold medalists for Spain
Olympic medalists in football
Medalists at the 1992 Summer Olympics
FIFA 100
Spanish football managers
La Liga managers
Segunda División managers
Segunda División B managers
FC Barcelona Atlètic managers
RC Celta de Vigo managers
FC Barcelona managers
Serie A managers
A.S. Roma managers
UEFA Champions League winning managers
Spain national football team managers
UEFA Euro 2020 managers
2022 FIFA World Cup managers
Spanish expatriate football managers
Expatriate football managers in Italy
Spanish expatriate sportspeople in Italy